St Patrick's Church is a Roman Catholic Church in Bolton, Greater Manchester, England. It was built in 1861 and is a Gothic Revival style building. It is situated on the corner of Great Moor Street and Johnson Street, to the west of Bradshawgate in the centre of the town. It is a Grade II listed building.

History

Foundation
In 1794, the first Roman Catholic church in the Bolton area since the English Reformation was established. It was Ss Peter and Paul Church on Pilkington Street. It was built from 1798 to 1800 outside the town in a churchyard among fields. In 1853, in the school of Ss Peter and Paul Church, it was decided to build a church in the centre of the town, which would become St Patrick's Church. Ss Peter and Paul Church was later replaced by a church built from 1896 to 1897 on the same site, which cost £20,200. In 1990, Ss Peter and Paul Church was reordered and in 2010 it was closed.

Construction
From the meeting in 1853 to establish St Patrick's Church in Bolton, a site was later found on Great Moor Street and an architect, Charles Holt, was commissioned to build the church. On 17 March 1861, the church was opened. Originally, the school was founded around the same time and housed in a three-storey warehouse. In 1884, a purpose-built school was constructed on Dawes Street, close to Great Moor Street.

Developments
From 1907 to 1911, when a Fr John Burke was parish priest, a new high altar and the stained glass east window were installed. In 1946, the top of the spire was replaced. Afterwards, in the post-war period, the school was closed.

Parish

St Edmund's Church
St Patrick's Church is served from St Edmund's Church on St Edmund Street in Bolton. St Edmund's Church was also founded from Ss Peter and Paul Church. In August 1860, the foundation stone of St Edmund's Church was laid by the Bishop of Salford, William Turner on Grime Street (which was later renamed St Edmund Street). It was finished in 1861. Originally, it had the school situated on the lower storey of the church. In the early twentieth century, the school was relocated and the lower storey became the parish hall. In the 1960s, the hall was extended and the church was reordered.

Merger
In 2003, the parishes of Ss Peter and Paul, St Patrick and St Edmund were merged. In 2010, with the closure of Ss Peter and Paul Church, the parish became known as St Edmund and St Patrick.

St Patrick's Church has one Sunday Mass, it is at 11:30am. St Edmund's Church has one Sunday Mass at 10:00am

See also

Listed buildings in Bolton
 Roman Catholic Diocese of Salford

References

External links

 St Patrick's Church, Bolton on Catholic Directory
 St Edmund's Church, Bolton on Catholic Directory
 Diocese of Salford site

Saint Patrick
Roman Catholic churches in Greater Manchester
Saint Patrick
Grade II listed Roman Catholic churches in England
19th-century Roman Catholic church buildings in the United Kingdom
Gothic Revival church buildings in England
Gothic Revival architecture in Greater Manchester
Roman Catholic churches completed in 1861
1861 establishments in England
Roman Catholic Diocese of Salford